North Carolina Highway 901 (NC 901) is a primary state highway in the U.S. state of North Carolina. The highway serves to connect the town of Harmony with nearby major highways.

Route description
NC 901 is a two-lane rural highway that traverses  from US 64, near Calahaln, to NC 115, near New Hope. Surrounded most of its journey with farmland, NC 901 is a no-thrills road through northern Iredell County.

NC 901 is a viable alternate route between Mocksville and Wilkesboro; it is shorter in mileage, though takes a few minutes longer than via US 601 and US 421.

History
Established by 1930 as a new primary routing, from US 64/NC 90 to US 21/NC 26, in Harmony. In 1937, NC 901 was extended northwest to its current northern terminus at NC 115.

Junction list

References

External links

 
 NCRoads.com: N.C. 901
 North Carolina Highway Begins/Ends - NC 901

Transportation in Davie County, North Carolina
Transportation in Iredell County, North Carolina
901